Azhar Khan may refer to:
Azhar Khan (cricketer), Pakistani cricketer
Azhar Khan (actor), Indian-American actor
Raja Azhar Khan, Pakistani politician